Roslyn is a city in Kittitas County, Washington, United States. The population was 893 at the 2010 census. Roslyn is located in the Cascade Mountains, about 80 miles east of Seattle. The town was founded in 1886 as a coal mining company town. During the 20th century, the town gradually transitioned away from coal, and today its economy is primarily based on forestry and tourism. The town was the filming location for The Runner Stumbles, Northern Exposure, and The Man in the High Castle. Many of the town's historical structures have been preserved, and its downtown was added to the National Register of Historic Places in 1978.

History

Early history
Coal deposits were first noted in the Roslyn area in 1883, with a large vein discovered at the upper Smith Creek canyon in 1885 by C.P. Brosious, Walter J. Reed, and Ignatius A. Navarre.  Roslyn was platted in 1886 by Logan M. Bullet, vice president of the Northern Pacific Coal Company, at the time that the company initiated the first commercial coal mining operations there, to support railway operations.

Throughout the mid-1880s, the Northern Pacific Railway, the parent of Northern Pacific Coal Company, pushed from the east to reach Puget Sound across the Cascade Mountains. The Northern Pacific began building across Stampede Pass just west of Roslyn, approaching from Wallula in the east and Tacoma in the west. A 77-mile (124-km) gap remained in 1886. In January of that year, Nelson Bennett was given a contract to construct a 9,850 foot (3,002 m) tunnel under Stampede Pass, completing it in 1888. Roslyn, which lies on the route to Stampede Pass, provided the coal for the railway construction work as well as the continuing railroad operations.

Between 1886 and 1929, immigrant workers from countries such as Italy, Poland, Slovakia, Germany, Lithuania, Slovenia, Serbia and Croatia as well as from England, Ireland, Scotland and Wales came to work in the mines. These immigrants maintained the traditions of their homelands, as seen in the historic Roslyn Cemetery, with its 26 sections for distinct ethnic and lodge cemetery areas. Many Roslyn residents today are descendants of these immigrant miners.

Roslyn's peak coal mine production of nearly 2 million tons was reached in 1910. As coal-fired steam trains were being replaced by diesel power, the mines began to shut down in the 1920s. Although the local coal mines were far from played out (approximately 80% of the coal in the Roslyn mines remains unextracted), the last mine in the area closed in 1963 as business became unprofitable. With the loss of jobs, an exodus of residents ensued. In the mid-1970s, Roslyn began to flourish again as artists and others rehabilitated the town's houses and commercial buildings and settled there. Some individuals own second homes in Roslyn, while working and living full-time in Seattle or Tacoma, for instance.

As Roslyn was a "company town", life in the early years was centered around the production of coal. Most of the citizens of the town worked either for the Northern Pacific Coal Company or in one of the smaller businesses monopolized by the company, or were family members of someone who did. A hub of life in the town was the Northwestern Improvement Company Store, now listed on the National Register of Historic Places; it still stands at the corner of First Street and Pennsylvania Avenue.

Like many 19th-century American towns and cities, where risk of fires was high, Roslyn had a major fire in 1888, which destroyed most of its commercial district. Many buildings constructed after the fire used fire-resistant brick and sandstone. Some of these historic structures are still in use, including the 1889 Brick Tavern and the circa-1890 Fischer Building.

During its days of prosperity, the Northern Pacific Coal Company built the Roslyn Athletic Club for miners and their families. It was completed in 1902 and contained a gym, meeting rooms, and a bowling alley. Roslyn's public library, which was founded in 1898, moved into the Roslyn Athletic Club building in 1918. It continues to serve the community from this location.

Most of the town's 500 homes were built in the 1920s on land owned by the railroad. The 1920s-era commercial district consisted of four square blocks, of which about one dozen buildings remain as representatives of western frontier commercial architecture. Roslyn has many examples of Victorian elegance in its surviving buildings, as well as simple miner's shacks. The town of Roslyn was listed on the National Register of Historic Places in 1978. Recently, Roslyn became a Certified Local Government. Its Historic Preservation Commission restored the Roslyn Cafe, a local landmark.

Roslyn's railroad tracks have been removed and replaced by the Coal Mines Trail which runs from Cle Elum through Roslyn to Ronald. A walk on the trail affords visitors a look at the remains of Roslyn's mines and railroad depot site. The Roslyn Museum houses an extensive collection of photos and mining memorabilia, and features an exhibit on Roslyn's unique ethnic cemeteries.

Most recently, recreation and tourism have become the chief drivers of the economy. The business community has worked to bring in more visitors through annual festivals, including the Manly Man Festival in June, the Pioneer Days Picnic, and a Coal Mining Festival associated with Coal Mining History Week each August.

Knights of Labor Strike of 1888 and African American migration

Tensions between management and labor in the Roslyn mines began spilling over in the summer of 1888, when management laid off a number of labor union workers who were petitioning for eight-hour work days and higher wages. These layoffs led to a labor strike by the Knights of Labor, which shut down the mines. Northwest Coal Company, which conducted mining operations at Mine No. 3, a few miles away in nearby Ronald, responded by recruiting strikebreakers. This included 50 black laborers from the East and Midwest who were transported by train with almost 40 private armed guards. The recruitment of these armed forces raised the interest of Territorial Governor Eugene Semple when he heard that they harassed area residents calling themselves U.S. Marshals. This was considered a paramilitary challenge to Washington Territory authority and Semple ordered the local sheriff to disperse the unit.

Semple visited Roslyn to investigate Northwest Coal Company's practices and condemned the company for hiring a private militia on suppositions that the white strikers would attack black laborers and overpower police forces. Semple's report describes the residents as "intelligent" and "law-abiding," and the company's suppositions as erroneous. He did not intervene on the labor disputes, and strikers continued to lose ground in negotiations.

In a span of two years, the company recruited more than 300 black laborers from Virginia, North Carolina, and Kentucky. Many relocated with families, and this migration was the largest increase in the African-American population of Washington Territory up until that time. Sheriff Packwood of Kittitas County reported to Semple that relations between out-of-work white workers and the black population were strained with potential to turn violent. However, after the strike broke tensions reduced, and whites reconciled with working along black miners. As the regional coal industry boomed, competition for employment reduced, and eventually workers organized as equals with United Mine Workers.

Mine accident of 1892
In 1892, 45 miners were killed in an explosion at Mine No. 1 near Roslyn, the deadliest mining accident in Washington history.

1892 Ben E. Snipes and Co. bank robbery
On September 24, 1892, a group of five bandits, known criminals and affiliates of Butch Cassidy, held up the Roslyn branch of the Ellensburg-based Ben Snipes Bank. Two of the men stood guard with the horses while the other three went inside. One of the men approached the cashier asking for what ever was in the already open vault. The other two men kept the customers in the store quiet, one of them was Dr. Lyon who would later be murdered and the case never solved. The five men rode away with $5,000 or $10,000, depending on the source. It is thought that the men were expecting the coal miner's pay, $40,000 coming from Tacoma, would have been held in the bank. However, the money was sent directly to the coal company.

The sheriff and his posse soon chased after the men and into the hills of Teanaway. In November 1892, three men were brought into the jail and were asked to be identified by the witnesses of the robbery. Cal, Kimize, and Zachary Hale were taken in and arrested. Cal was the only one of the three men to be charged and found guilty of the crime.

A couple of months later, the Kittitas County Courts, received a  letter from Utah, telling them that they had convicted the wrong man. Cal Hale was set free and the search for Tom, George, William and Fred McCarthy, as well as Ras Lewis (alias Ras Christiansen and Matt Warner). In April 1893, a posse traveled down into Oregon looking for these bandits. George and William went with the men without a fight. Tom, Fred and Ras took off and were soon lost. Later that month the Yakima County Attorney received a letter from Rosa Lewis, Ras Lewis' wife, stating that she knew that the men had done it and she was tired of her husbands battle with the law. Soon after the Sheriff and his posse went to the cabin at the "7 U Ranch", owned by Fred Beezley, that Ras and his wife were leasing.

All five men were eventually taken into custody and tried. George and Ras attempted to break free and ran around the city of Ellensburg until the sheriff was able to detain them. There were two separate trials that would take place. This first was dismissed due to being a mistrial and the second one ending without any answers. It is rumored that the lawyer simply asked the men to tell them where the money had been stored. Court records state that they simply did not have witnesses that were able to testify.

The trials and all other fees associated with bringing justice to the county nearly bankrupted Kittitas County. Ras Lewis changed his name to Matt Warner, he was involved in a shoot out in 1895 and was arrested, serving 4 years. After that he became a Justice of the Peace and Sheriff of Price, Utah until his death in 1938.

Several of the McCartys were later killed during an attempted bank robbery in Colorado.

African American population 
In 1890, Roslyn's African American population was 22%, one of the highest in the state. Black fraternal organization lodges and civic institutions were established, including Prince Hall Masons, Knights of Pythias, Eastern Star, Daughters of Tabernacle, and African Methodist Episcopal Church. The Black population began to decline after the mines closed in 1963, and by the early 1970s only the Craven family remained. William Craven was elected mayor of Roslyn in 1976, and was the first African American mayor in the state of Washington.

The Roslyn Black Pioneers was established by Ethel Florence Craven to preserve and promote black history in Washington. The organization received a grant from Humanities Washington to build educational floats for Washington parades.

Roslyn's ethnic cemeteries

The Roslyn Cemetery is composed of 26 separate but adjacent cemetery plots, reflecting the diversity of early immigrant society. It was placed on the National Register of Historic Places in 1978.

The Independent Order of Odd Fellows (IOOF), Knights of Pythias Lodge, Soloka Lodge, Wanapum Tribe 28, Improved Order of Redmen, Cacciatori d’Africa (literally Hunters of Africa – an Italian lodge), Croatian Fraternal Union Lodge No. 56, SNF Lodge No. 79 (Serbian), St. Barbara Lodge No. 39 (Greek Catholic), and Dr. David Starcevich Lodge No. 56 (Croatian) are among the organizations and ethnicities represented at the cemetery. At least 24 nationalities are represented among the nearly 5,000 graves.

Post mining era
 Although Roslyn clings to its coal mining and timber harvesting past, it has become a tourist and recreation destination. Tourism to the town received a boost when it was feature as the filming location for The Runner Stumbles and Northern Exposure. The town's proximity to Seattle makes it a popular destination for recreational travelers.

As many as 2,000 luxury homes are being developed nearby, potentially adding to the old town's population.  Forests once owned and managed by Plum Creek Timber Company have been sold to two development companies, which are in the process of developing an extensive golf course community with houses and condominiums on the boundary of Roslyn. The new community is called Suncadia. As in similar small towns being transformed by large-scale capital projects and outside investment, these changes are expected to significantly improve Roslyn.

However, some community members in Roslyn were concerned about the effects a Master Planned Resort would have on their community's economy and ecology. A Roslyn-based citizen group called RIDGE engaged Suncadia's owners in litigation to mitigate the effects of the resort. RIDGE and MountainStar Resort Development—who owned the land at the time—engaged in negotiations and signed the RIDGE Settlement Agreement in 2001. Though the Settlement Agreement was eventually dissolved in 2013 when Kittitas County Judge Scott R. Sparks terminated the Agreement and all remaining claims, the Settlement Agreement was successful in some of their mitigations such as Suncadia's purchase and donation of the Roslyn Urban Forest to the city of Roslyn and the Suncadia Resort being developed and built using labor paid Washington state's prevailing wage.

Roslyn's railroad tracks have been removed and replaced by the Coal Mines Trail which runs from Cle Elum through Roslyn to Ronald. A walk on the trail affords visitors a look at the remains of Roslyn's mines and railroad depot site. The Roslyn Museum houses an extensive collection of photos and mining memorabilia, and features an exhibit on Roslyn's unique ethnic cemeteries.

Most recently, recreation and tourism have become the chief drivers of the economy. The business community has worked to bring in more visitors through annual festivals, including the Manly Man Festival in June, the Pioneer Days Picnic, and a Coal Mining Festival associated with Coal Mining History Week each August.

Featured in media
The Runner Stumbles, a 1979 film starring Dick Van Dyke and Kathleen Quinlan, was filmed in Roslyn. Numerous local residents appeared in the movie as extras. Directed and produced by Stanley Kramer, the film was released by Twentieth Century Fox. Viewers of the film who have gone to Roslyn as tourists often stop at the Immaculate Conception Church, which was featured.
Northern Exposure (1990–95), a hit CBS television series, filmed its exterior scenes for the fictional town of Cicely, Alaska, in Roslyn and the surrounding area. Featured in the opening title sequence are the Roslyn Cafe and a moose, the latter provided by Washington State University. Many local residents served as extras in the show, and some gained small parts. The Northern Exposure link is a tourist draw; many local stores use the show as a theme for their goods.
In 2014, the Amazon Studios's TV adaptation of Philip K. Dick's novel The Man in the High Castle was filmed in Roslyn, which was represented as Cañon City, Colorado in the series.

Geography
Roslyn is located at  (47.225091, -121.002985). It is  – about 1 hour 25 mins – east-south-east from Seattle, Washington

Demographics

2010 census
As of the census of 2010, there were 893 people, 437 households, and 224 families residing in the city. The racial makeup of the city was 95.1% White, 0.4% African American, 1.1% Native American, 0.6% Asian, 0.1% from other races, and 2.7% from two or more races. Hispanic or Latino of any race were 2.7% of the population.

There were 437 households, of which 22.2% had children under the age of 18 living with them, 39.8% were married couples living together, 8.5% had a female householder with no husband present, 3.0% had a male householder with no wife present, and 48.7% were non-families. 39.6% of all households were made up of individuals, and 13.1% had someone living alone who was 65 years of age or older. The average household size was 2.04 and the average family size was 2.73.

The median age in the city was 43.2 years. 18.4% of residents were under the age of 18; 5.2% were between the ages of 18 and 24; 29.1% were from 25 to 44; 32.2% were from 45 to 64; and 15.1% were 65 years of age or older. The gender makeup of the city was 52.6% male and 47.4% female.

2000 census
As of the census of 2000, there were 1,017 people, 467 households, and 249 families residing in the city. The population density was 82.3/km2 (213.0/sq mi).

There were 623 housing units at an average density of 130.5 per square mile (50.4/km2). The racial makeup of the city was 95.87% White, 0.79% African American, 1.38% Native American, 0.39% Pacific Islander, and 1.57% from two or more races. Hispanic or Latino of any race were 1.38% of the population. Identification as to ethnicity in 2000 was as follows: 17.9% were of German ancestry, 15.9% English, 10.3% Irish, 7.1% Norwegian, 6.6% American, 5.7% Croatian, 5.7% Scotch-Irish, and 5.1% Italian.

There were 467 households, out of which 25.7% had children under the age of 18 living with them, 43.9% were married couples living together, 6.2% had a female householder with no husband present, and 46.5% were non-families. 37.9% of all households were made up of individuals, and 18.2% had someone living alone who was 65 years of age or older. The average household size was 2.18 and the average family size was 2.89.

In the city, the population was spread out, with 21.9% under the age of 18, 6.5% from 18 to 24, 26.9% from 25 to 44, 26.6% from 45 to 64, and 18.0% who were 65 years of age or older. The median age was 42 years. For every 100 females, there were 96.0 males. For every 100 females age 18 and over, there were 90.9 males.

The median income for a household in the city was $35,313, and the median income for a family was $45,179. Males had a median income of $32,379 versus $25,625 for females. The per capita income for the city was $18,412. About 8.2% of families and 12.6% of the population were below the poverty line, including 9.1% of those under age 18 and 15.5% of those age 65 or over.

Points of interest in Roslyn
 Old City Hall & Library – Badly damaged in the 2001 Nisqually earthquake, this important public building is on the National Register of Historic Places as the anchor building of the Roslyn Historic District. The City of Roslyn and the Friends of the Roslyn Library have collaborated to support its structural repair and renovation.
 Roslyn Museum – Located on Pennsylvania Avenue, the museum includes an excellent display of artifacts from Roslyn's glory days as a coal mining town.
 Historic Coal Mines – Visitors can go to the Roslyn municipal offices, located on the corner of Pennsylvania Avenue and First Street, for information on tours of the historic coal mines. No tours go inside the mines.
 Roslyn Sunday Market – Every Sunday from June through September, this outdoor farmer's market and craft fair is located on Pennsylvania Avenue, offering a selection of local fruits, vegetables, arts, crafts and locally produced specialty items.
 Immaculate Conception Church – Located on Idaho and "B" Streets overlooking Roslyn, this Roman Catholic church has a spire that is a notable landmark in the town. It was built in 1887 and continues to serve the local community with regular masses held every Sunday. The church was used for scenes in the 1979 film The Runner Stumbles. 
 Storefront Studio – This yearly project is a collaboration between the Roslyn Downtown Association and the University of Washington's architectural department. Each year (usually April through May), numerous students come to work with commercial, civic and community clients on real, small-scale architectural, planning, public art, and landscape projects in the town. More information is available at the Roslyn Visitor Center.
 Coal Mines Trail – Originating in nearby Cle Elum, this hiking and recreational trail passes through Roslyn before ending in the town of Ronald.  The trail follows the original Northern Pacific Railway line.  Access is at the east end of Pennsylvania Avenue.
 Coal Miners' Memorial – Located across from the current city hall, this memorial statue commemorates those individuals who lost their lives in local coal mining. 
 Cicely's Gift Shop- founded in 1989 by Marianne Milos Ojurovich, the store originally opened in a 9' x 11' former coal mine weight station building set in the back of an empty lot on 2nd street. In 1995 after the ending of the globally famous television show Northern Exposure, she relocated the store to its current location, the former set of Dr. Fleischmans office, which she kept as intact as possible.
 The Brick Tavern – In 1889, John Buffo and Peter Giovanni opened a tavern in this location. The tavern was rebuilt in 1898 using 45,000 bricks and took the name "The Brick". It is billed as the oldest continuously operating tavern in the state of Washington. The building was used for scenes of a fictional tavern of the same name in the 1990s television series Northern Exposure.
 Roslyn Cemetery – Divided into areas by lodge (Knights of Labor, Elks, IOOF, Red Men etc.) and by country of origin (Croatian, Italian, Polish, Slovak, etc.), the cemetery provides a historical perspective on Roslyn.
 Ronald, Washington – Approximately 2 miles west of Roslyn, this town was built over Mine No. 3, where Southern black miners were brought in 1892 to work as strikebreakers. 
 Lake Cle Elum- Lake Cle Elum is a popular year-round recreational destination for camping, fishing, boating, and swimming. 
Salmon La Sac –  Salmon La Sac is a nature area along the Cle Elum River used for kayak races, and it serves as an access point to the nearby wilderness and backcountry activities including hiking, 4x4ing, snow shoeing, cross-country skiing, and snowmobiling. It leads into and is in the Okanogan-Wenatchee National Forest.

Roslyn Historic District

The Roslyn Historic District consists of the town of Roslyn as of 1977 which corresponds to the 1914 plat map, as well as the cluster of 26 cemeteries southwest of the town and a  open space, bisected by the tracks of the Roslyn Branch of the Northern Pacific Railroad, east of the town.

Commercial buildings contributing to the historical designation include:
Roslyn City Hall and Library
Immaculate Conception Catholic Church and Rectory 
Northwestern Improvement Company Store
The Brick Tavern
Cle Elum State Bank
Mary's Freezer Shop

Further reading

References

External links

 City of Roslyn
 Roslyn Museum
 Roslyn Public Library
 Roslyn and the TV show, Northern Exposure, Curt Cass website
 "Roslyn's Black History collection", Group of 84 historic photographs dating from the late 19th century to the 1960s of African-American miners, settlers and residents of the coal mining community of Roslyn, Washington, at Central Washington University.
 Ellensburg History, 294 historic photographs dating from the late 19th century to the early 20th century, of Ellensburg and the other communities in Kittitas County, including Roslyn, at Central Washington University.
 "Roslyn Heritage", collection of historic photos and lectures, Roslyn Public Library.
Roslyn, Cle Elum, and Ronald Oral History Interviews, Central Washington University Library
Guide to the Black Oral History Interviews, 1972-1974, Washington State University Libraries.

Cities in Kittitas County, Washington
Cities in Washington (state)
African-American history of Washington (state)
National Register of Historic Places in Kittitas County, Washington